OAL may refer to:

Transport 
 Cacoal Airport, Brazil
 Oatley railway station, Sydney, Australia
 Olympic Air, a Greek regional airline
 Olympic Airlines, defunct, the former flag carrier of Greece

Other uses 
 California Office of Administrative Law, in the United States
 Open Audio License
 Der Ostasiatische Lloyd, a German language newspaper published in Shanghai, China
 Overall length, particularly of an ammunition cartridge
 Oakland Athletic League, a subdivision of CIF Oakland Section